Priya is a 1978 Indian thriller film directed by S. P. Muthuraman, starring Sridevi in the title role along with Rajinikanth, Aznah Hamid, and Ambareesh. It was simultaneously made in Tamil and Kannada languages. The story is an adaptation of writer Sujatha's novels. The Tamil version was released on 22 December 1978, and the Kannada version on 12 January 1979. It was dubbed and released in Telugu as Ajeyudu which released on 10 March 1979 and was also dubbed in Hindi as Love in Singapore in 1983. The soundtrack of this film is recorded using Dolby Stereophonic technology for the first time in Tamil cinema. It was Sridevi's first and only Kannada film as a lead actress.

Plot 

Priya is a movie star who is exploited by her producer Janardhan. Janardhan has such a tight control over Priya's financial and personal affairs that he refuses to let her marry her boyfriend Bharat. Before she flies off to Singapore for a film shoot, Priya seeks the help of lawyer Ganesh to get rid of Janardhan. How Ganesh helps Priya overcome her problems accounts for the rest of the film, which includes a side story of Ganesh falling in love with a Malay-Indian girl named Subadhra.

Cast 
Sridevi as Priya
Rajinikanth as Ganesh
Ambareesh as Bharath
Major Sundarrajan / K. S. Ashwath as Janardhan
Thengai Srinivasan as Film director
Aznah Hamid as Subadhra
K. Natraj as Kaalimuthu

Production 
The film was shot in Singapore, Hong Kong and Malaysia.

Soundtrack 
The soundtrack was composed by Ilaiyaraaja. It was recorded using Dolby Stereophonic technology for the first time in Tamil cinema using eight tracks. Ilaiyaraaja revealed he wanted to use this technology in Annakili (1976); however since he was a debutant, sound engineers did not encourage him that time. When Ilaiyaraaja came to know that K. J. Yesudas had equipments for stereophonic technology, he acquired them. The "Akarai Cheemai Azhaginile" song's pallavi is based on the song "Kites" by Simon Dupree and the Big Sound. The song "Hey Paadal Ondru" is set in the Carnatic raga known as Kapi.

Reception 
Kousikan of Kalki found Priya to be entirely different from Sujatha's novel but praised the locations and cinematography. Another Tamil weekly wrote, "if this is what Panju wanted to do to Sujatha's novel he needn't have opted it for it at all". Responding to the criticism, Arunachalam said the original novel had dialogues between two characters over 40 pages and audience would not have patience if it was faithfully presented onscreen, so he made changes keeping the "very ordinary filmgoer in mind".

Allegations 
The footage of the famous car chase sequence from the Steve McQueen film Bullitt was edited and spliced into the climax scene of this film; however, the allegations that ensued was that it was done so without permission.

References

Bibliography

External links 
 

1970s Kannada-language films
1970s multilingual films
1970s Tamil-language films
1970s thriller films
1978 films
Films based on Indian novels
Films directed by S. P. Muthuraman
Films scored by Ilaiyaraaja
Films set in Singapore
Films shot in Singapore
Films with screenplays by Panchu Arunachalam
Indian multilingual films
Indian thriller films